Kensuke Shiina is a Japanese DJ and musician, electronic technician, an exponent of trip hop and lounge music. His notable recordings date from the late 1990s. He was an original member of Yann Tomita's group Audio Science Laboratorie. He makes unique electronic musical instruments.

Style
Kensuke Shiina music has been described variously as downtempo, trip hop, Shibuya-kei, ambient, and electronic. He is known for his Ring of Fire remixes and Insomniac track.

Discography
Compilations
A Journey into Ambient Groove Vol.2 (1995)
Fish Smell Like Cat (1997) UK cd: Pussyfoot CDLP005
Suck it and See (1998) UK 2 cd: Pussyfoot CDLP069
Pussy Galore (1997) UK cd: Pussyfoot CDLP007

References

External links

Japanese DJs
Japanese electronic musicians
Living people
Electronic dance music DJs
Year of birth missing (living people)